Club Voleibol Teruel is a professional volleyball team based in Teruel, Spain. It plays in the Superliga and in the CEV Cup.

Trophies
Superliga: 7 
2009, 2010, 2011, 2012, 2014, 2018, 2019
Copa del Rey: 6 
2011, 2012, 2013, 2015, 2018, 2020
Supercopa de España: 8 
2009, 2012, 2013, 2014, 2016, 2017, 2018, 2019

Notable former players
 Jure Kvesič (2005–06)
 José Miguel Cáceres (2010–11)
 Víctor Batista (2009–11)
 Luis Pedro Suela (2009–11)
 Manuel Sevillano (2011–13)
 Rodman Valera

External links
Official website 

Spanish volleyball clubs
Sports teams in Aragon
Volleyball clubs established in 1991
1991 establishments in Spain
Sport in Teruel